Virginia City Hall is the seat of government for Virginia, Minnesota, United States.  It was designed by architect Frederick German and built from 1923 to 1924. It continues to house municipal offices, the Virginia Police Department, and a public meeting hall.  Virginia City Hall was listed on the National Register of Historic Places in 2004 for its local significance in the theme of politics/government.  It was nominated for being the long-serving seat of Virginia's municipal government.

See also
 List of city and town halls in the United States
 National Register of Historic Places listings in St. Louis County, Minnesota

References

External links
 

1923 establishments in Minnesota
Buildings and structures in Virginia, Minnesota
City and town halls in Minnesota
City and town halls on the National Register of Historic Places in Minnesota
Colonial Revival architecture in Minnesota
Government buildings completed in 1924
National Register of Historic Places in St. Louis County, Minnesota